Norbert Loizeau is a  Seychelles engineer and politician.  member of the National Assembly of Seychelles.  he is a member of the Seychelles National Party, and was first elected to the Assembly in 2007.

References
Member page on Assembly website

Year of birth missing (living people)
Living people
Members of the National Assembly (Seychelles)
People from Bel Air, Seychelles
Seychellois engineers
Seychelles National Party politicians